Molkki - Rishton Ki Agnipariksha is an Indian Hindi-language television drama series produced by Ekta Kapoor and Shobha Kapoor under their banner Balaji Telefilms. The series is the second season of Molkki. It premiered on 13 February 2023 on Colors. The series stars Ashish Kapoor and Vidhi Yadav as lead actors.

Plot
The series is a social drama based on the hardships of a woman defying patriarchal norms and societal barriers. The series depicts the journey of the protagonist Bhoomi (Vidhi Yadav) who dreams to become an artist but is compelled to marry a Thakur under the archaic practice of Molkki (buying brides). The series explores how the life of Bhoomi and hardships faced by her after her marriage with Thakur Suraj Singh (Ashish Kapoor).

Cast

Main 
 Vidhi Yadav as Bhoomi
 Ashish Kapoor as Thakur Suraj Singh

Recurring
 Shahab Khan as Shyamlal
 Neha Chandra as Urvashi
 Ashish Singh as Gagan
 Vivan Mudgal
 Moin Khan
 Ankit Vyas
 Piyali Munshi as Nirma / Kumud
 Bhavya Sachdeva

References

External links 
 

2023 Indian television series debuts
Balaji Telefilms television series
Colors TV original programming
Hindi-language television shows
Indian drama television series
Indian television soap operas